30 Rock is an American satirical sitcom television series created by Tina Fey that originally aired on NBC from October 11, 2006, to January 31, 2013. The series, based on Fey's experiences as head writer for Saturday Night Live, takes place behind the scenes of a fictional live sketch comedy show depicted as airing on NBC. The series's name refers to 30 Rockefeller Plaza in New York City, where the NBC Studios are located and where Saturday Night Live is written, produced, and performed. The series was produced by Lorne Michaels's Broadway Video (which also produces Saturday Night Live) and Fey's Little Stranger, in association with NBCUniversal.

30 Rock episodes were produced in a single-camera setup (with the exception of the two live episodes that were produced in the multiple-camera setup) and were filmed in New York. The pilot episode premiered on October 11, 2006, and seven seasons followed. The series stars Fey with a supporting cast that includes Alec Baldwin, Tracy Morgan, Jane Krakowski, Jack McBrayer, Scott Adsit, Judah Friedlander, Katrina Bowden, Keith Powell, Lonny Ross, John Lutz, Kevin Brown, Grizz Chapman, and Maulik Pancholy.

Tonally, 30 Rock uses surreal humor to parody the complex corporate structure of NBC and its parent companies General Electric and Comcast. Described as "a live-action cartoon", the show was influential in its extensive use of cutaways. 30 Rock won several major awards (including Primetime Emmy Awards for Outstanding Comedy Series in 2007, 2008, and 2009 and nominations for every other year it ran) and appeared on many critics' year-end "best of" 2006–2013 lists. On July 14, 2009, the series was nominated for 22 Primetime Emmy Awards, the most in a single year for a comedy series. Over the course of the series, it was nominated for 103 Primetime Emmy Awards and won 16, in addition to numerous other nominations and wins from other awards shows. Despite the high praise, the series struggled in the ratings throughout its run, something which Fey herself has made light of.

In 2009, Comedy Central and WGN America bought the syndication rights to the show, which began airing on both networks on September 19, 2011; the series also entered into local broadcast syndication on the same day. 30 Rock is regarded as a landmark series, and one of the greatest television series of all time, particularly the 21st century. Its series finale in particular has been named as one of the greatest in television history by several publications. In 2013, the Writers Guild of America West named 30 Rock the 21st best-written television series of all time.

Premise
Liz Lemon is head writer and showrunner of the NBC sketch comedy series TGS with Tracy Jordan (originally called The Girlie Show), produced in Studio 6H in 30 Rockefeller Plaza. She supervises cast and crew, including star Jenna Maroney, her best friend, while working with network executive Jack Donaghy and page Kenneth Parcell. In the first episode, Jack forces Liz to hire the unpredictable Tracy Jordan as co-star.

Episodes often depict conservative Jack and liberal Liz's disagreements, Jenna's attempts to become a film star, Tracy's immature behavior, and the characters' romantic and personal lives. The show satirizes the cultures of NBC, parent company General Electric, and the entertainment industry. The network airs programs like reality shows MILF Island, Queen of Jordan and America's Kidz Got Singing as well as paranormal drama Hunchbacks, and game shows Gold Case and Celebrity Homonym. In later seasons, the show depicts the network being acquired by Philadelphia-based media company Kabletown, a fictionalization of the acquisition of NBC Universal by Comcast.

Development and production

Conception
In 2002, Fey was the head writer and a performer on the television show Saturday Night Live (SNL). She pitched the show that became 30 Rock to NBC, originally as a sitcom about cable news. NBC Entertainment president Kevin Reilly felt that "Fey was using the news setting as a fig leaf for her own experience and [he] encouraged her to write what she knew." The show was subsequently reworked to revolve around an SNL-style sketch show. After being presented to Reilly once more, the show was set to air during the 2005–2006 television season.

In May 2003, Fey signed a contract with NBC to remain in her SNL head writer position until at least the 2004–2005 television season and to develop a primetime project to be produced by Broadway Video and NBC Universal. Filming was postponed due to Tina Fey's first pregnancy.

During the 2004–2005 pilot season, a pilot was announced named Untitled Tina Fey Project. The 30 Rock pilot focused on the boss of a variety show who must manage her relationships with the show's volatile star and its charismatic executive producer. The storyline evolved into one that dealt with a head writer of a variety show who dealt with both of the stars, as well as the show's new network executive. 30 Rock was officially given the green light to air May 15, 2006, along with a 13-episode order.

The series underwent further changes during the months leading up to and following its debut. A May 2006 press release mentioned that sketches from The Girlie Show would be made available in their entirety on NBC's broadband website, DotComedy.com. The idea was to air the fictitious TGS with Tracy Jordan online. This aspect of the series was abandoned prior to its debut.

Filming
Interior scenes for 30 Rock were mostly filmed at Silvercup Studios in Long Island City, Queens, New York City (Studio 8H in 30 Rock in Manhattan for two live episodes). In the episodes "Cleveland" and "Hiatus", Battery Park City, Manhattan, and Douglaston, Queens, doubled for Cleveland, Ohio and Needmore, Pennsylvania, respectively. The show often built elaborate sets, once using a set that took three days to build for only six seconds of video. In the episode "Gavin Volure", stock footage of the Arkansas Governor's Mansion was used for exterior shots of the home of Steve Martin's character.

The title sequence comprises photos and videos of 30 Rockefeller Plaza and features the series regulars. The sequence ends with a time lapse of the building and then a title card reading "30 Rock". The sequence remained mostly the same throughout the series, although changes were made to most of the actors' images.

Music
The series features a "jaunty" jazz score. Most of the incidental music melody is played by either clarinet, bass clarinet, saxophone, or strings, often as wildly varying renditions of the usual central theme. The music is composed by Fey's husband, Jeff Richmond, who is also a producer for 30 Rock. Richmond wrote the theme music, which was nominated for the Primetime Emmy Award for Outstanding Main Title Theme Music. Seven short, original songs have been featured in episodes, five of which were performed by Krakowski, another performed by Fey and Jason Sudeikis, and another performed by Morgan.

The show also covered three existing songs, including the song "Midnight Train to Georgia" by Gladys Knight and the Pips. The song had its lyrics altered to accommodate the character Kenneth being "misinformed about the time [of the 11:45 train]". The song "Oh My" performed by The Gray Kid is heard throughout the episode "The Source Awards", which was mixed with a piano arrangement composed by Richmond. "Kidney Now!", a rendition of the popular song, "We Are the World", is performed by various artists in the season-three finale. Other popular songs have been featured (with blessings by the singers), such as "I Will Remember You" or "Bitch".

The 30 Rock Original Television Soundtrack was released by the Relativity Music Group on November 16, 2010.

Internet content
On April 2, 2008, NBC announced 30 Rock 360, an online extension of the 30 Rock series. The extension featured Jack Donaghy's Online Business Courses (or Jack U). Users could also read Jack's blogs and upload their own business advice in video form. Users could submit sketches for TGS with Tracy Jordan and act out skits from TGS. The feature reopened Ask Tina, an interactive question and answer platform in which users could ask Fey questions. Fey answered the questions in video form. Ask Tina was a fixture on NBC.com's 30 Rock section throughout the first season.

Cast and characters

Main
30 Rock features an ensemble cast. The seven roles that receive star billing during the opening credits are:
 Tina Fey as Liz Lemon, a "sexually frightened know-it-all" and head writer of TGS with Tracy Jordan
 Tracy Morgan as Tracy Jordan, the loose-cannon, crazy, and unpredictable star of TGS
 Jane Krakowski as Jenna Maroney, the original star of The Girlie Show, co-star of TGS and Liz's constantly attention-seeking, arrogant, narcissistic, and clueless best friend
 Jack McBrayer as Kenneth Ellen Parcell, a cheerful, simple-minded, obedient Southern-born NBC page who "lives for television"
 Scott Adsit as Pete Hornberger, the "sane," quick-witted producer of TGS, who often reveals embarrassing details about his family life
 Judah Friedlander as Frank Rossitano, a trucker hat-wearing, manchildish, sarcastic writer at TGS whose hat bears a different phrase in every episode
 Alec Baldwin as Jack Donaghy, the decisive, controlling, suave, and occasionally senseless network executive who constantly interferes with the goings-on at TGS

Beginning with season two, several actors received star billing after the opening credits.
 Katrina Bowden as Cerie Xerox, Liz's beautiful, laid-back assistant, who usually wears revealing outfits to work, much to the delight of the writers' room (seasons 2–7; recurring season 1)
 Keith Powell as James "Toofer" Spurlock, a TGS writer who is "two for one," a Harvard guy and a black guy, and the polar opposite of both Tracy and Frank (seasons 2–7; recurring season 1)
 Lonny Ross as Josh Girard, a young and immature TGS writer and co-star, known for his impressions (seasons 2–4; recurring season 1)
 Kevin Brown as Walter "Dot Com" Slattery, an erudite member of Tracy's entourage who is also a Wesleyan University-trained stage actor (seasons 3–7; recurring seasons 1–2)
 Grizz Chapman as Warren "Grizz" Griswold, a gentle giant member of Tracy's entourage (seasons 3–7; recurring seasons 1–2)
 Maulik Pancholy as Jonathan, Jack's loyal and overprotective personal assistant, who at times appears to be in love with Jack (seasons 3–5, 7; recurring seasons 1–2)
 John Lutz as J. D. Lutz, a lazy, overweight TGS writer who is often insulted or made fun of by the rest of the staff (seasons 4–7; recurring seasons 1–3)

Recurring
 Dean Winters as Dennis Duffy, Liz's irresponsible ex-boyfriend
 Chris Parnell as Leo Spaceman, Tracy's quack doctor who regularly provides him with experimental treatments
 Jason Sudeikis as Floyd DeBarber, a lawyer working in 30 Rockefeller who dates Liz before moving home to Cleveland
 Rachel Dratch appears as several minor characters in seasons 1, 5, and 6, including 4 episodes as Greta Johansen, a cat wrangler working on TGS
 Sue Galloway as Sue LaRoche-Van der Hout, a French-Dutch writer hired by TGS and often referred to as "girl writer"
 Cheyenne Jackson as Jack "Danny" Baker, a TGS cast member added in the fourth season
 James Marsden as Criss Chros, Liz's boyfriend and later husband, who ran a hot dog stand in his first episodes of the series

Casting
Fey worked with Jen McNamara and Adam Bernstein for the casting of the series. Fey's first act as casting director was to cast herself as the lead character, Liz Lemon, who is said to be much like Fey herself when she first became head writer on SNL. The next actor to be cast was Tracy Morgan as Tracy Jordan, who was then a former castmate of Fey's in SNL. Morgan was asked by Fey to play the role, and he believed it was "right up [his] alley and it was tailor made for [him]". Fey said that the character of Kenneth was written with McBrayer in mind. McBrayer is an old friend of Fey's (they worked together at Second City in Chicago), and she "really wanted him for that part and was very happy when no one objected".

Rachel Dratch, Fey's longtime comedy partner and fellow SNL alumna, was originally cast to portray Jenna. Dratch played the role in the show's original pilot, but in August 2006, Krakowski was announced as Dratch's replacement, with Dratch remaining involved in the show playing various characters. Fey explained the change by noting that Dratch was better-suited to playing a variety of side characters, which was suitable when the show intended to feature actual sketches from TGS with Tracy Jordan. However, this aspect of the show was scrapped, thus they required more of a straight-ahead acting part for the role of Jenna.

Although Fey went on to say, "Rachel and I were both very excited about this new direction," Dratch said that she was not happy with the media's depiction of the change as a demotion; furthermore, she was also skeptical about the reasons she was given for the change and was not happy with the reduction in the number of episodes in which she would appear. Following the first season, Dratch only appeared in a handful of episodes.

Shortly following the casting of McBrayer and Dratch, Baldwin was cast as Jack, the "totally uncensored" vice president of East Coast Television and Microwave Oven Programming. Fey said that the character of Jack was written with Baldwin in mind, and she was "very pleasantly surprised when he agreed to do it". Judah Friedlander was cast as Frank Rossitano, a staff writer of The Girlie Show. Friedlander had never met Fey before auditioning for a role in 30 Rock. His character was based on at least two writers with whom Fey used to work at SNL, but he has said that he "certainly brought some of [his] own things to it, as well". Finally, Scott Adsit was cast as Pete Hornberger, a longtime friend of Liz's and producer of The Girlie Show. Adsit, an old friend of Fey's, also had his character written based on him.

Following SNLs ongoing tradition, 30 Rock had several real-life politician cameos, including Al Gore (twice), Nancy Pelosi (series finale) and Condoleezza Rice (as Jack's former love interest).

Episodes

Season one

Season one began airing on October 11, 2006, and featured 21 episodes. The season finale aired on April 26, 2007. Jack Donaghy, the "Head of East Coast Television and Microwave Oven Programming" at General Electric (GE), is transferred to work at the NBC headquarters, 30 Rockefeller Plaza, and retool the late-night sketch-comedy series The Girlie Show. The show's cast and crew are outraged by this, especially head writer Liz Lemon and main actress Jenna Maroney. Jack proceeds to wreak havoc on The Girlie Show, forcing Liz to hire off-the-wall movie star Tracy Jordan. He again irritates the cast and crew of The Girlie Show when he changes the name to TGS with Tracy Jordan (or just TGS).

As the season progresses, the episodes become less about TGS and more about how the characters deal with juggling their lives and their jobs . Specifically, Liz, but other characters are also explored. Episodes also become less self-contained, and various story arcs develop in the second half of the season. For example, the first major story arc centers on Liz's relationship with Dennis Duffy (Dean Winters), "The Beeper King". Other story arcs include Jenna promoting her movie The Rural Juror; Tracy going on the run from the Black Crusaders; Jack's engagement, which was eventually called off, to a Christie's auctioneer named Phoebe (Emily Mortimer); and another relationship of Liz's with Floyd (Sudeikis).

Season two

Season two began airing on October 4, 2007, and featured 15 episodes. The second season was originally intended to consist of 22 episodes, but the order was cut to 15 due to the 2007–2008 Writers Guild of America strike. The season finale aired on May 8, 2008. After Liz broke up with Floyd in the summer, she is looking for ways to rebound. When Jerry Seinfeld confronts Jack about a new marketing campaign which featured clips of Seinfeld's sitcom, Seinfeld, in all NBC shows, he has a chance encounter with Liz that gives her some much-needed advice. During the TGS summer hiatus, Jenna becomes overweight due to performing in the Broadway show Mystic Pizza: The Musical (based on the real 1988 film Mystic Pizza). Tracy has encountered some marital problems with his wife Angie Jordan (Sherri Shepherd) and they become separated, but later reunite.

During the season, Jack develops a relationship with a Democratic congresswoman named Celeste "C. C." Cunningham (Edie Falco). They later break up. An arc that was established in the first season, but becomes more apparent in the second, regards Jack running for the GE chairmanship against his nemesis Devon Banks (Will Arnett). The season ends with Liz planning to adopt a child after believing she was pregnant with Dennis' baby. Kenneth also travels to Beijing to be a page at the 2008 Summer Olympics, and Tracy invents a pornographic video game. Jack ends the season working at a new government job in Washington, DC, but plans to get fired by proposing a "gay bomb".

Season three

Season three began airing October 30, 2008, and concluded on May 14, 2009. The show experienced a large ratings and popularity spike this season after Tina Fey's highly praised performance as Sarah Palin on SNL. This is also the season where the show made Primetime Emmy Award history, being nominated for 22 awards. The season consisted of 22 episodes. Oprah Winfrey guest-starred in the second episode, playing herself (actually a drug-induced hallucination of Liz's), as well as Jennifer Aniston playing Liz's ex-roommate. Salma Hayek also appeared for a multiple-episode arc, portraying Jack's new girlfriend, Elisa. Other guest stars this season included John Lithgow, Kerry Butler, Megan Mullally, Peter Dinklage, and Steve Martin. Jon Hamm played Liz's love interest and neighbor for several episodes. Alan Alda appeared in the season's final two episodes as Milton Greene, Jack's biological father.

Season four

The fourth season premiered on October 15, 2009. Like the previous season, it also consisted of 22 episodes. A recurring story arc early in the season revolved around Jack's request that Liz cast a new actor for TGS and Liz's subsequent search for the perfect comedian, much to Jenna and Tracy's dismay, who fear losing their spotlight. The show fictionalizes the acquisition of NBC Universal by Comcast, announced during the season, by portraying the network being acquired by Philadelphia-based cable company Kabletown. The latter half of the season focused on complementary story arcs: Jack's inability to choose between his two girlfriends, Liz's inability to find a boyfriend to live up to her expectations, and Jenna's relationship with a Jenna Maroney impersonator. The season also featured such guest stars as Jeff Dunham, Julianne Moore, Jon Bon Jovi, Cheyenne Jackson, Sherri Shepherd, Will Forte, Elizabeth Banks, Michael Sheen, Matt Damon, and James Franco.

Season five

30 Rock premiered its fifth season on September 23, 2010. An [[Live Show|episode of 30 Rock'''s fifth season]] was produced and broadcast live, twice, on the evening of October 14, 2010. The two separate performances resulted in a live telecast of the episode to American viewers on both the West and East Coasts, to ensure both would view a live performance. Produced in front of a live audience, the episode aired at 8:30 pm EDT and PDT on NBC. A ratings success, the episode was also met with positive reviews.

Season five focuses on Liz Lemon's continuing relationship with Carol Burnett (Matt Damon), Jack's start into fatherhood with fiancée Avery Jessup (Elizabeth Banks), struggling with the merger of NBCUniversal with Kabletown, Tracy's foray into getting an EGOT, and Kenneth's attempt to get back to NBC. Aside from featuring the return of Rachel Dratch in "Live Show," other guest stars include Matt Damon, Elizabeth Banks, Susan Sarandon (as Frank's former teacher- who was in prison due to their relationship while he was a student- and present girlfriend), Paul Giamatti (as one of the TGS editors), Sherri Shepherd, Queen Latifah, Rob Reiner, John Amos, Jon Hamm (reprising his role as Drew, Liz Lemon's former love interest who despite being a doctor, she dumped for being too dumb), Julia Louis-Dreyfus (playing the reimagined version of Liz Lemon and also as herself playing this character in "Live Show"), Bill Hader, Chris Parnell, Kelsey Grammer (playing himself), Buck Henry, David Gregory, John Slattery, Daniel Sunjata, Will Forte, Kelly Coffield Park, Elaine Stritch, Dr. Condoleezza Rice, Alan Alda, Cheyenne Jackson, Robert De Niro (playing himself), Dean Winters, Ken Howard, Vanessa Minnillo, Brian Williams (playing himself), Richard Belzer, Ice-T, John Cho, Chloë Grace Moretz (as Kaylie Hooper – the granddaughter of Kabletown CEO Hank Hooper and Jack's sworn enemy as heir to the Kabletown throne), Terrence Mann (as oceanographer Bob Ballard), Cristin Milioti (as Abby Flynn in "TGS Hates Women"), Eion Bailey, Adriane Lenox, Michael Keaton, Margaret Cho (as Avery's kidnapper, North Korean dictator Kim Jong-il), and Tom Hanks (as himself in "100: Part 1" and "100: Part 2").

Season six

The sixth season debuted mid-season on January 12, 2012, to accommodate Tina Fey's second pregnancy.

Season six finds Liz emotionally maturing while in a new relationship; Jack continues to attempt to recover his wife from North Korea and find his identity at Kabletown, Kenneth moves up (and later down) the corporate ladder. Jenna reaches a new level of fame due to being a judge on a reality show and considers settling down with boyfriend Paul.

Many LGBT groups called for Tracy Morgan's resignation or dismissal from the show due to anti-gay comments he made between the end of season five and the filming for season six. Morgan issued an apology and continued with his starring role. 30 Rock had previously received an award from GLAAD, commending the show on its portrayal of LGBT themes and characters. The scandal inspired the second episode of the season, in which Tracy Jordan goes on an offensive rant during a standup set, forcing the show to apologize on his behalf after he mistakenly apologizes to Glad, the plastic bag company, instead of GLAAD.

Season seven30 Rock returned for a final, abbreviated season consisting of 13 episodes, which began airing on October 4, 2012. Alec Baldwin reportedly approached NBC and offered to cut his pay for 30 Rock to be renewed for a full seventh and eighth seasons, stating on Twitter: "I offered NBC to cut my pay 20% in order to have a full 7th and 8th seasons of 30 Rock. I realize times have changed."

Season seven continues to develop the relationship between Liz and Criss (James Marsden), as the pair tries for children and considers getting married. Meanwhile, Jack attempts to improve his prospects at the company, first by trying to "tank" NBC and convince Kabletown CEO Hank Hooper (Ken Howard) to sell it, and later by plotting to discredit Hooper's granddaughter and future CEO, Kaylee Hooper (Chloë Grace Moretz). Ultimately, however, he begins to wonder if he is truly happy. Elsewhere, Tracy has found success with his new movie studio, which produces comedy films mostly starring African American actors, similarly to Tyler Perry; Jenna prepares to marry her long-term boyfriend Paul (Will Forte), and Kenneth has started a relationship with Hazel (Kristen Schaal), unaware that she is using him to get her moment on TGS.

Reception

Critical30 Rock has received many positive reviews from critics. Chris Harnick, writing in the Huffington Post, has ranked it along with I Love Lucy and Seinfeld as one of the great TV comedies. The Writers Guild of America West listed it as the 21st best written TV series.  Its series finale has been rated highly by several publications. HitFix ranked it the 15th best series final, IndieWire included it in its list of 16 best series finals, and HuffPost named it the 5th best.

The first season of 30 Rock was reviewed favorably by critics. Metacritic gave the pilot episode a Metascore—a weighted average based on the impressions of a select thirty-one critical reviews—of 67 out of 100. Robert Abele of LA Weekly declared that the show was a "weirdly appropriate and hilarious symbol of our times". The Wall Street Journal's Dorothy Rabinowitz wrote that the "standard caution is relevant—debut episodes tend to be highly polished. All the more reason to enjoy the hilarious scenes and fine ensemble cast here". Some less favorable reviews were received from Brian Lowry of Variety. Lowry said, "Despite her success with Mean Girls, Fey mostly hits too-familiar notes in the pilot. Moreover, she's a limited protagonist, which is problematic." Maureen Ryan of the Chicago Tribune criticized "30 Rock for being less than the sum of its parts, and, as an entry in the single-camera comedy sweepstakes, it fails to show either the inspired inventiveness of Arrested Development or provide the surprisingly perceptive character studies of The Office".

At the end of 2006, LA Weekly listed 30 Rock as one of the best "Series of the Year". The show also appeared on similar year end "best of" 2006 lists published by The New York Times, The A.V. Club, The Boston Globe, the Chicago Sun-Times, Entertainment Weekly, the Los Angeles Times, the Miami Herald, People Weekly, and TV Guide. The Associated Press wrote that NBC's "Thursday night comedy block—made up of My Name Is Earl, The Office, Scrubs, and 30 Rock—is consistently the best night of prime time viewing for any network." In 2007, it appeared on The Boston Globe's "best of" list as well as the "best of" lists of the Chicago Sun-Times, the Chicago Tribune, Entertainment Weekly, the Los Angeles Times, Newark Star-Ledger, The New York Times, Pittsburgh Post-Gazette, The San Francisco Chronicle, The San Jose Mercury News, TV Guide and USA Today. 30 Rock was named the best series of 2007 by Entertainment Weekly.

At the end of 2009, Newsweek magazine ranked 30 Rock as the best comedy on TV in the past decade, and at the end of 2010, Metacritic reported that the show ranked 12th place in their list of collected Television Critic Top Ten Lists. At the end of 2012, a poll undertaken by 60 Minutes and Vanity Fair named 30 Rock the seventh greatest sitcom of all time. In 2013, the Writers Guild of America named 30 Rock as one of the best-written television series of all time, ranking it at 21st place. In 2019, the series was ranked 12th on The Guardian newspaper's list of the 100 best TV shows of the 21st century.

Awards and nominations

Capping its critically successful first season, 30 Rock won the Primetime Emmy Award for Outstanding Comedy Series and Elaine Stritch was awarded Outstanding Guest Actress in a Comedy Series in September 2007 for her work as a guest actress in the season one finale episode, "Hiatus". Tina Fey and Alec Baldwin were nominated in the Outstanding Lead Actress and Outstanding Lead Actor in a comedy series categories, respectively. "Jack-Tor" and "Tracy Does Conan" were both nominated for Outstanding Writing for a Comedy Series. 30 Rock received four Creative Arts Emmy Awards. Alec Baldwin received the Golden Globe Award for Best Actor in a Television Series – Musical or Comedy in 2007. Baldwin also received the Screen Actors Guild Award for Outstanding Performance by a Male Actor in a Comedy Series in 2007. The show also received various other guild award nominations during its first season and the Peabody Award.

In 2008, Tina Fey and Alec Baldwin both won Screen Actors Guild Awards. The series took home the Writers Guild of America Award for Best Comedy Series in 2008. It also received the Danny Thomas Producer of the Year Award in Episodic Series – Comedy from the Producers Guild of America in 2008. 30 Rock received 17 Primetime Emmy Award nominations for its second season, meaning it was the second-most nominated series of the year. These 17 nominations broke the record for the most nominations for a comedy series, meaning that 30 Rock was the most-nominated comedy series for any individual Primetime Emmy Award year. The previous holder of this record was The Larry Sanders Show in 1996 with 16 nominations. 30 Rock also won the Television Critics Association Award for Outstanding Achievement in Comedy.

In 2008, 30 Rock completed a sweep of the major awards at the 60th Primetime Emmy Awards. The show won Outstanding Comedy Series, Alec Baldwin was recognized as Outstanding Lead Actor in a Comedy Series, and Tina Fey was given the award for Outstanding Lead Actress in a Comedy Series. This marked the eighth time in the Primetime Emmy Awards history that a show won best series plus best lead actor and actress. Tina Fey also won the award for Outstanding Writing for a Comedy Series for the second-season finale episode, "Cooter".

At the 66th Golden Globe Awards, 30 Rock won the award for Best Television Series – Musical or Comedy, Alec Baldwin won Best Actor in a Television Series – Musical or Comedy, and Tina Fey won Best Actress in a Television Series – Musical or Comedy.

At the 67th Annual Peabody Awards, 30 Rock received the Peabody Award for the show's 2007 episodes. Upon announcing the award, the Peabody Board commended the show for being "not only a great workplace comedy in the tradition of The Mary Tyler Moore Show, complete with fresh, indelible secondary characters, but also a sly, gleeful satire of corporate media, especially the network that airs it".

In 2009, 30 Rock received a record-breaking 22 Primetime Emmy Award nominations and won five of them, including Outstanding Comedy Series, Outstanding Lead Actor in a Comedy Series (Baldwin), and Outstanding Writing for a Comedy Series for "Reunion". It received 15 Primetime Emmy Award nominations in 2010, including the series' fourth consecutive nominations for Outstanding Comedy Series, Outstanding Lead Actor in a Comedy Series (Baldwin), and Outstanding Lead Actress in a Comedy Series (Fey). 30 Rock received 9 Primetime Emmy Award nominations, in 2011 and 13 in 2012.

In 2013, 30 Rocks seventh and final season received 13 Primetime Emmy Award nominations (the most of any comedy series and the most of any final season of a comedy series), including Outstanding Lead Actress in a Comedy Series for Fey, Outstanding Lead Actor in a Comedy Series for Baldwin, Outstanding Supporting Actress in a Comedy Series for Krakowski, directing, two nominations for writing, and its seventh consecutive nomination for Outstanding Comedy Series, bringing the series' total number of nominations to 103. The series' casting directors won their third prize for Outstanding Casting for a Comedy Series, while Tina Fey and Tracey Wigfield won for their writing for the series finale, "Last Lunch".

At the 19th Screen Actors Guild Awards, both Fey and Baldwin won for their performances in the Female and Male comedy categories, respectively, while the cast received their final nomination for Outstanding Performance by an Ensemble in a Comedy Series.

Ratings
Below, "Rank" refers to how well 30 Rock rated compared to other television series which aired during primetime hours of the corresponding television season; for example, in its first year, 101 television series were rated higher. The television season begins in September of any given year and ends in May of the following year. "Viewers" refers to the average number of viewers for all original episodes (broadcast in the series' regular timeslot) of 30 Rock aired during the television season. Although the viewer average may be higher for some seasons than others, the rank will not necessarily be higher. This is due to the number of programs aired during primetime. In some seasons, more regular programs may be aired during primetime than in others.

The pilot episode generated 8.13 million viewers, the series' highest ratings until that of its third-season premiere which garnered 8.5 million viewers. In its original timeslot of Wednesday at 8:00 pm EST, the show averaged 6.23 million viewers. 30 Rock aired on Wednesdays for its first four episodes. The season's lowest ratings were achieved by "Jack the Writer" and "Hard Ball" which both achieved 4.61 million viewers. The season-two premiere, "SeinfeldVision" was viewed by 7.33 million viewers, the highest rating since the pilot. On January 10, 2008, 30 Rock entered a hiatus due to the 2007–2008 Writers Guild of America strike. The episode that aired on that date was viewed by 5.98 million viewers. The second-season finale, "Cooter", which aired on May 8, 2008, was viewed by 5.6 million viewers.

On December 29, 2006, Nielsen Media Research (NMR) reported the results of having, for the first time, monitored viewers who use a digital video recorder to record shows for later viewing. NMR reported that 30 Rock adds nearly 7.5% to its total audience every week as a result of viewers who use a DVR to record the show and then watch it within a week of its initial airing. A March 2007 report from MAGNA Global, based on NMR data about viewership ranked by among adults 25–54, shows that as of the time of the report 30 Rocks viewers have a median income of $65,000, high enough to place the show tied at 11th in affluence with several other shows. This is during a period where for the season 30 Rock is tied at number 85 in the 18–49 demographic. During its second season, 30 Rock ranked in fourth place, against all primetime programming, for television series which are watched by viewers with income above $100,000. Following Fey's popular impressions of Alaskan governor Sarah Palin on Saturday Night Live, the third-season premiere was seen by 8.5 million viewers, making it the highest-viewed episode in the series. The premiere earned a 4.1 preliminary adults 18–49 rating, an increase of 21% from the second-season premiere.

Similarities to other media
Two shows debuting on 2006–07 NBC lineup, 30 Rock and Studio 60 on the Sunset Strip, revolved around the off-camera happenings on a Saturday Night Live-analogue sketch comedy series. Similarities between the two led to speculation that only one of them would be picked up. Baldwin said, "I'd be stunned if NBC picked up both shows. And ours has the tougher task, as a comedy, because if it's not funny, that's it." Kevin Reilly, then president of NBC Entertainment, was supportive of Fey, describing the situation as a "high-class problem":

Evidence of the overlapping subject matter between the shows, as well as the conflict between them, arose when Aaron Sorkin, the creator of Studio 60 on the Sunset Strip, asked Lorne Michaels to allow him to observe Saturday Night Live for a week, a request Michaels denied. Despite this, Sorkin sent Fey flowers after NBC announced it would pick up both series, and wished her luck with 30 Rock. Fey said, "it's just bad luck for me that in my first attempt at prime time I'm going up against the most powerful writer on television. I was joking that this would be the best pilot ever aired on Trio. And then Trio got canceled." Fey wound up "beating" Sorkin when Studio 60 was canceled after one season and 30 Rock was renewed for a second. Though 30 Rocks first-season ratings proved lackluster and were lower than those of Studio 60, Studio 60 was more expensive to produce.

One early promo for 30 Rock portrayed Alec Baldwin mistakenly thinking he would meet Sorkin, and when asked on her "Ask Tina" space what she thought of the criticism that 30 Rock received, Fey jokingly replied that people who did not like it were probably confusing it with Studio 60. However, none of 30 Rocks producers have given Studio 60 any serious criticism, positive or negative. In a November 1, 2006, interview, Fey said she had seen the first two episodes of Studio 60. When asked what her impressions were, she jokingly replied, "I can't do impressions of Bradley Whitford and Matthew Perry."

At least five 30 Rock episodes have briefly parodied Studio 60:
 "Jack the Writer" contains a self-referring walk and talk sequence, such sequences being commonly used on Studio 60 and Aaron Sorkin's previous shows.
 "Jack-Tor": Liz tries to quote global education statistics, only to mess up and realize that she does not know what she is talking about.
 "Jack Meets Dennis": Liz says the upcoming show will be "worse than that time we did that Gilbert and Sullivan parody." The second episode of Studio 60, "The Cold Open," included a parody of the "Major-General's Song" on the show-within-the-show.
 "The Fabian Strategy": In the ending sequence, Kenneth watches the credits for TGS, which include Ricky and Ronnie as writers, the two ex-head writers on Studio 60.
 "Plan B": Aaron Sorkin appears as himself as Liz is attempting to get a new job at NBC's The Sing-Off. Sorkin explains to Liz that he, too, is having trouble finding work writing for television, despite having written such works as The West Wing, A Few Good Men, and The Social Network. Liz adds Studio 60 to that list, but Sorkin tells her to "shut up". The two of them also engage in Sorkin's signature "Walk and Talk" during their exchange, leading them to where they started the conversation, which Liz points out.

Some critics have compared 30 Rock to The Mary Tyler Moore Show, with parallels drawn between the relationship of Liz and Jack and that of Mary Richards and Lou Grant. It has also been compared to That Girl. Like That Girl and Mary Tyler Moore, 30 Rock is a sitcom centering on an unmarried, brunette career woman living in a big city where she works in the television industry. That Girl was parodied in the opening segment of 30 Rocks pilot.

Syndication
It was announced in 2009 that off-network syndication rights for 30 Rock had been acquired by Comedy Central and WGN America for about $800,000 an episode. Between 2011 and 2012, the show was syndicated on local broadcast networks in the United States.

Aborted potential spin-off and removed episodes
In 2019, Tina Fey and 30 Rock co-showrunner Robert Carlock received a straight-to-series order for an untitled comedy series from NBC. The original script was meant to see Baldwin reprise Jack Donaghy's role and was to follow his political career as mayor of New York following the series finale. Baldwin was in negotiations for a year to star in the project before dropping out. Ted Danson replaced Baldwin as the lead character, and the series setting was changed to Los Angeles to accommodate Danson's wish to remain in his home city. Following this, the series (now titled Mr. Mayor) was rewritten to lose any connections to 30 Rock.

On June 22, 2020, at the request of Fey and Carlock, NBC announced that four episodes of the series that depict actors in blackface would be removed from streaming services and taken off circulation on TV.
Fey stated: "As we strive to do the work and do better in regards to race in America, we believe that these episodes featuring actors in race-changing makeup are best taken out of circulation. I understand now that 'intent' is not a free pass for white people to use these images. I apologize for pain they have caused".  The episodes that were removed are the third season episode "Believe in the Stars" and the fifth season episode "Christmas Attack Zone", both of which featured Jenna in blackface; the sixth season episode "Live from Studio 6H", which featured guest star Jon Hamm in blackface; and the east coast version of the fifth season episode "Live Show". The lattermost's west coast version remained. The decision to remove the episodes came amid protests over the murder of George Floyd.

 Reunion special 

On June 16, 2020, NBC announced that it would produce a one-off, hour-long reunion special, which premiered on July 16. The hour-long special aired with no commercial interruptions, but featured promotions and tie-ins for programs airing across NBCUniversal properties (including its new streaming platform Peacock) for the 2020-21 television season — effectively acting as a substitute for a physical upfronts presentation due to the COVID-19 pandemic. The special was produced with the involvement of NBCUniversal Creative Partnerships. The same day, an accompanying online summit for media and advertisers included an early screening of the special, while the special became available on Peacock and aired on other NBCUniversal cable networks on July 17. A number of major NBC affiliate groups declined to air the special, citing concerns over its aim to be a vehicle for promoting NBCUniversal's cable networks and Peacock.

Home media
Universal Studios Home Entertainment released all seven seasons on DVD in addition to releasing a complete collection bundle. The complete DVD and Blu-ray sets were released through Mill Creek Entertainment on April 21, 2020.

Episode downloads and online streaming
Episodes of 30 Rock are available to download for a per-episode fee, to U.S. residents only, via Amazon Video, Apple's iTunes Store, Google Play. Back when the show was still running, it was also available on the now-defunct "NBC Direct" service. In addition to paid downloads, all seven seasons can be streamed on Hulu in the U.S. with a paid subscription, having moved there from Netflix on October 1, 2017, under a new agreement with NBCUniversal Television and New Media Distribution. The previous Netflix deal had existed for much of the show's run, and lasted several years after.

All 7 seasons of 30 Rock'' (barring the aforementioned four episodes removed from circulation) returned to Netflix on August 1, 2021, and were removed from the service on July 31, 2022, and the series moved to Peacock while remaining on Hulu.

DVD releases

References

External links

 
 
 

 
2006 American television series debuts
2013 American television series endings
2000s American satirical television series
2000s American single-camera sitcoms
2000s American surreal comedy television series
2000s American workplace comedy television series
2010s American satirical television series
2010s American single-camera sitcoms
2010s American sitcoms
2010s American surreal comedy television series
2010s American workplace comedy television series
Best Musical or Comedy Series Golden Globe winners
English-language television shows
General Electric
Metafictional television series
NBC original programming
Outstanding Performance by an Ensemble in a Comedy Series Screen Actors Guild Award winners
Peabody Award-winning television programs
Primetime Emmy Award for Outstanding Comedy Series winners
Primetime Emmy Award-winning television series
Television series about show business
Television series about television
Television series by Broadway Video
Television series by Universal Television
Television series created by Tina Fey
Television shows filmed in New York (state)
Television shows set in New York City